Terry Bush (29 January 1943 – 30 July 2018) was an English professional footballer who played as a forward for Bristol City for his entire career before retiring due to injury in 1970. He played 182 games and scored 45 goals in all competitions, of which 43 goals came from 162 games in the Football League. After retiring he joined the club's staff as assistant secretary before becoming a full-time official for the Transport and General Workers Union.

References

1943 births
2018 deaths
English footballers
English Football League players
Association football forwards
Bristol City F.C. players
Place of birth missing